Ralekoti Mokhahlane (born 3 June 1986) is a Mosotho footballer who currently plays as a midfielder. He has won six caps for the Lesotho national football team since 2006.

International career

International goals
Scores and results list Lesotho's goal tally first.

References

External links

Association football midfielders
Lesotho footballers
Lesotho international footballers
1986 births
Living people
FC Balzers players